In a cyclic order, such as the real projective  line, two pairs of points separate each other when they occur alternately in the order. Thus the ordering a b c d of four points has (a,c) and (b,d) as separating pairs. This point-pair separation is an invariant of projectivities of the line.

The concept was described by G. B. Halsted at the outset of his Synthetic Projective Geometry:

Given any pair of points on a projective line, they separate a third point from its harmonic conjugate.

A pair of lines in a pencil separates another pair when a transversal crosses the pairs in separated points.

See also
 Separation relation

References
 G. B. Halsted (1906) Synthetic Projective Geometry, Introduction, page 7 via Internet Archive

 Edward V. Huntington and Kurt E. Rosinger (1932) "Postulates for Separation of Point-Pairs (Reversible order on a closed line)", Proceedings of the American Academy of Arts and Sciences 67(4): 61-145 via JSTOR

 Bertrand Russell (1903) The Principles of Mathematics, Separation of couples via Internet Archive
 
Projective geometry